Kathleen Wong Mei Yin (born 12 October 1970) is a political activist promoting unity and harmony  in Perak, Malaysia. Previously, she served as an Economic and Political Officer for the Australian High Commission in Malaysia. She acts as a liaison for the Australian and Malaysian government. She is a member of the Malaysian Chinese Association (MCA), a major component party of the Barisan Nasional (BN) coalition.

Education
Born and raised in Perak, Kathleen Wong or fondly known as Kat Wong received her primary and secondary school education in Methodist Girl School in Ipoh, Perak.  She later went on to pursue her A Level in Sunway College. She later went to New Zealand to Waikato University and obtained a bachelor's degree in Administration (1999).

Career in government agencies
Kathleen Wong served in various government ministries and office before she decided to go into politics. She served as an assistant registrar for the Malaysian Election Commission (2005 to 2008), visiting board member for the Tengku Permaisuri Bainun Hospital (2004-2007) and Taman Ipoh/Canning Zone Coordinator for the Ipoh City Council (2003-2005).

Joining politics
Kathleen Wong is the Deputy Director at Institute of Strategic Analysis and Policy Research (INSAP), a research center founded by the Malaysian Chinese Association (MCA). She holds various positions in MCA; and in the 2013 general election; she was chosen by the Barisan Nasional committee to be the candidate to contest Ipoh Timor parliamentary seat but lost. In the 2018 general election; she was picked as the BN candidate to contest Ipoh Timor seat and she lost again.

Election results

References

1970 births
Living people
People from Perak
Malaysian people of Hokkien descent
Malaysian people of Chinese descent
Malaysian Chinese Association politicians
University of Waikato alumni
21st-century Malaysian politicians